Maulana Abul Kalam Azad Arabic and Persian Research Institute (MAPRI) in Tonk in Rajasthan is the premier Indian institute engaged in promotion and furtherance of Arabic and Persian studies. This institute was established by the Government of Rajasthan  in 1978 with the main objective of conserving and preserving the sources of Persian and Arabic manuscripts available in Rajasthan. This Institute has earned international repute because of its aims, objectives and achievements.

There is also a large Holy Quran present in the Arabic Persian Research Institute Tonk which is very beautiful.And Some of the important & historical manuscripts are displayed in a separate hall with the name of "Display Hall". Namda calligraphy, art of charming photography, collection of postage stamps etc. are displayed in an Art Gallery started in 2002. Calligraphy on human hair, pulse, rice and sesame along with the lines written inside the transparent glass bottles are main attractions for many visitors.

References 
Maulana Abul Kalam Azad Arabic and Persian Research Institute Rajasthan, Tonk

Tonk district
Research institutes in Rajasthan
Archives in India
State agencies of Rajasthan
Museums in Rajasthan
Tourist attractions in Tonk district
1978 establishments in Rajasthan
Organizations established in 1978